is located in the town of Fujikawaguchiko in southern Yamanashi Prefecture near Mount Fuji, Japan. It is the second largest of the Fuji Five Lakes in terms of surface area, and is located at the lowest elevation. It also has the longest shoreline of any of the Fuji Five Lakes.

The lake is within the borders of the Fuji-Hakone-Izu National Park.

The lake has no natural outlet, and flooding of settlements on its shores was a problem until the construction of a canal, completed in 1914, to connect it to a tributary of the Sagami River.

As with the other Fuji Five Lakes, the area is a popular resort, with many lakeside hotels, windsurfing facilities, camp sites, and excursion boats. Japanese white crucian carp and wakasagi were introduced to the lake in the Meiji period, and sports fishing is also popular. Lake Kawaguchi is the most popular of the Fuji Five Lakes in terms of tourists, and has the most developed tourist infrastructure. The area also serves as a major hub for those wishing to climb Mount Fuji during the climbing season (July and August), and is also popular with photographers due to the panoramic views of the mountain from the shore.

In 2013 the lake was added to the World Heritage List as part of the Fujisan Cultural Site.

One of the best ways to visit the lake from Tokyo is the JR operated Limited Express Fuji Excursion. The train runs up to three times daily from Shinjuku Station.
The area is also served by frequent motorway coach services from various locations in Tokyo, including Shinjuku Expressway Bus Terminal, Tokyo Station, Shibuya Mark City, etc. Most of these services are operated by Fuji Kyuko.

Climate

Gallery

See also

 Fuji Five Lakes
 Fuji-Hakone-Izu National Park
Tenjō-Yama Park Mt. Kachi Kachi Ropeway

External links

Kawaguchiko home page
Kawaguchiko.net

Notes

Kawaguchi
Tourist attractions in Yamanashi Prefecture
Mount Fuji
Landforms of Yamanashi Prefecture
World Heritage Sites in Japan
Fujikawaguchiko, Yamanashi
Minobu, Yamanashi